Livai Natave (born 20 April 1999) is a Fijian rugby union player who plays for  in Super Rugby. His playing position is prop. He was named in the Drua development squad for the 2023 Super Rugby Pacific season.

Natave is a naval officer by trade and represents Suva in the Skipper Cup. He represented Fiji U20 between 2017 and 2019, and the Fiji Warriors in 2019. He was named in the Fijian Latui squad for the short-lived 2020 Global Rapid Rugby season, before being named as standby for the Fiji national team in July 2022. He was named to tour for the 2022 end-of-year rugby union internationals in October 2022, and made his international debut against Scotland, before winning a further cap and featuring against the Barbarians during the tour. He was then named in the Drua development squad for the 2023 season.

References

External links
itsrugby.co.uk profile

1999 births
Fijian rugby union players
Fiji international rugby union players
Living people
Rugby union props
Fijian Drua players